Abu-l-Hasan Ali ibn Mohammed al-Tamgruti (born in Tamegroute ca. 1560, died in 1594/5) was a Moroccan author, ambassador, fqih and one of the most important officials of the Saadian court during the reign of Ahmad al-Mansur. He was in charge of the embassy to the Turkish sultan Murad III together with secretary of state Abd al-Aziz al-Fishtali. He is best known because of the rihla of his journey to Istanbul in 1590-91. He was buried in the sanctuary of Qadi Ayyad in Marrakesh.

References

16th-century Moroccan writers
Moroccan travel writers
Moroccan Maliki scholars
Year of birth unknown
1595 deaths
16th-century Moroccan people
Moroccan diplomats
Ambassadors of Morocco to the Ottoman Empire
People from Tamegroute
16th-century diplomats
16th-century Berber people
Berber writers
16th-century jurists